The UCI ProSeries is the second tier women's elite road cycling tour. It was inaugurated in 2020. The series is placed below the UCI Women's World Tour, but above the various 1.1/2.1 and 1.2/2.2 races.

Events
The inaugural UCI ProSeries calendar consisted of 7 events, of which only 2 ran due the COVID-19 pandemic. In 2021 the number of events expanded, but again the COVID-19 pandemic let to multiple cancellations, with only 6 events running.

Winners by race

Most race wins

References 

 
Women's road cycling
ProSeries
Recurring sporting events established in 2020